Nazarena of Jesus, O.S.B. Cam. (October 15, 1907 – February 7, 1990), was an American Roman Catholic Camaldolese nun, who spent most of her adult life in a monastery as an anchoress, or  recluse.

Life
She was born Julia Crotta on October 15, 1907, in Glastonbury, Connecticut, the youngest of seven children of Italian immigrant parents. She studied at the Hartford Conservatory, then piano, violin (with Hugo Kortschak) and composition (with David Stanley Smith and Richard Donovan) at the Yale School of Music. During a Holy Week retreat in 1934, she reportedly had a religious experience that was to have a profound effect on her. She matriculated at Albertus Magnus College. After college, she worked briefly in the Catskills and as a secretary in Manhattan.		

To discern a possible monastic vocation, Crotta joined the Carmel of Our Lady of Mt. Carmel and St. Thérèse of the Child Jesus, in Newport, Rhode Island. She stayed about three months before she left, seeking a more solitary way of life. Traveling to Rome, she joined the Camaldolese nuns of the Monastery of Sant'Antonio Abate on the Aventine Hill, where she remained for about a year, when her superior recommended she try Carmel once more. She then entered the Carmel of the Reparation in the fall of 1938, where she pronounced simple vows as a Discalced Carmelite nun. However, due to the wartime food shortages and the austere fasting the nuns practiced, she found it extremely difficult there and in July 1944, just before her solemn vows, left to take a job in a soup kitchen. She later found a job at the Allied Financial Agency.

Following a private audience with Venerable Pope Pius XII, Crotta was invited into the Camaldolese monastery in Rome on November 21, 1945 to live as a "recluse" or lay anchoress. She then took the name Maria-Nazarena of Jesus.

Nazarena was to remain in a secluded cell in that monastery, leading a strict ascetic regime, for the rest of her life, hearing Mass through a grille, and receiving her food and messages from the Mother Superior and the other nuns through a slot in the door to her cell. She spoke to no one directly, except once a year, when she spoke to the priest who served as her spiritual director. Those meetings could last an entire day, during which she would talk for hours.

As a Camaldolese nun, Nazarena pronounced her simple vows on December 15, 1947, and professed her solemn vows on May 31, 1953.  Pope Paul VI visited the monastery on Ash Wednesday of 1966 (February 23 that year), and blessed Nazarena through her grille, while she wore a black veil covering her face.

Death and legacy
She died at the monastery on February 7, 1990, aged 82.

On November 21, 2013, during a visit to the Camaldolese monastery, Pope Francis visited Sister Nazarena's cell.

References

1907 births
1990 deaths
People from Glastonbury, Connecticut
American people of Italian descent
Albertus Magnus College alumni
American expatriates in Italy
Camaldolese Order
Discalced Carmelite nuns
American hermits
Italian hermits
20th-century American Roman Catholic nuns
Catholics from Connecticut